Heterotoma planicornis is a species of bug from Miridae family.

Description

The species are black or dark red coloured with pale green legs. Adults have some short hairs and strange shaped antennae, with a large flattened second antennal segment (hence the Latin species name planicornis, meaning flat horn). The nymphs are reddish in color and also have said strange antennae.

These species are look almost like its counterpart, Heterotoma merioptera and can be difficult to distinguish.

Ecology
The eggs are laid into young wood, hatch in May and the nymphs become adults by June. Adults occur from July to September. The eggs overwinter. This  plant sucker shows one generation per year.

The nymphs and adults are active predators of spiders, aphids and mites. They are polyphagous, feeding on various insects (Psyllidae species, aphids and small other insects, Chrysomelidae and Lepidoptera eggs), but also on numerous plants and trees.

They prefer unripe fruits, buds, juices and nectar of various plants, mainly of Crataegus species, common alder (Alnus glutinosa), common hazel  (Corylus avellana), oak (Quercus robur), nettles (especially Urtica dioica) and tansy Tanacetum vulgare.

Distribution and habitat
The species can be found in the Nearctic realm, and in Central, Western, and Eastern Europe as far as the Caspian Sea, except for the Baltic states, Faroe Islands, Finland, Malta, and former Yugoslavia. These quite common bugs occur in neglected orchards, hedge rows, and in many gardens.

References

 Kerzhner, I. M., and M. Josifov / Aukema, Berend, and Christian Rieger, eds. (1999), Catalogue of the Heteroptera of the Palaearctic Region, vol. 3: Cimicimorpha II: Miridae

Insects described in 1772
Hemiptera of Europe
Orthotylini
Taxa named by Peter Simon Pallas